Vincent F. Zarrilli (1932-2018) was a businessman who oversaw a cookware and pottery store at The Pot Shop of Boston in Massachusetts.

He was a notable critic of Boston's Big Dig.

Boston Bypass

The Boston Bypass was a proposal that was floated by Zarrilli as an alternative to the Big Dig. The plan, as espoused by Zarrilli, would be to build a 10-mile double-deck road-and-rail bridge over Boston Harbor from Dorchester to Charlestown including railway access to Logan Airport. The intent would be to remove traffic from the downtown stretch of Interstate 93, also known as the Central Artery.

Zarrilli was a major opponent of the Big Dig, and was notable during the 1980s and 1990s as the man responsible for a multitude of hand-lettered signs posted around the Boston area reading "Back the B.B.". Zarrilli supported the construction of the roadway despite the completion of the Big Dig, feeling that the depressed Artery would not provide sufficient traffic relief.

Little to no research was done to establish the feasibility of the project, and it never garnered much support in the state legislature. The Boston Bypass is not to be confused with the South Boston Bypass Road (originally known as the South Boston Haul Road), an early project of the Big Dig built along an old railroad right-of-way in South Boston and used to carry commercial traffic to Logan Airport.

References

General references
 Boston Globe (May 21, 1989) Short Circuits Section: Focus; Page 79.
 Howe, Peter J. (June 25, 1989) Boston Globe You can't say he doesn't think big. Section: Focus; Page 81
 Boston Globe (December 9, 1989) A better Boston bypass. Section: Editorial page; Page 26.
 Howe, Peter J. (December 17, 1989) Boston Globe Zarrilli plan enters the fast lane. Section: Focus; Page A15.
 Rosenberg, Ronald. (February 25, 1990) Boston Globe Bridge-bypass alternative to plan for central artery gets support. Section: Metro; Page 25.
 Boston Globe (June 29, 1990) Ask the Globe. Section: National/foreign; Page 64.
 Marantz, Steve (August 2, 1990) Boston Globe Struggling over artery bypass. Section: Metro; Page 18.
 Rosenberg, Ronald. (August 20, 1990) Boston Globe Panel circling, seeking a place to land. Section: Metro; Page 17.
 Worcester Telegram & Gazette (September 16, 1990) East county neighbors. Section: Local news; Page B3.
 Boston Globe (August 4, 1993) Ask the Globe. Section: National/foreign; Page 78.
 Negri, Gloria. (October 19, 1994) Boston Globe Artery-depression foe files lawsuit. Section: Metro; Page 58.
 Kindleberger, Richard; Babson, Jennifer. (March 22, 1998) Boston Globe Lots & blocks. Section: Real Estate; Page H1.

External links

 https://www.potshopofboston.com/

Living people
Businesspeople from Boston
Transportation in Boston
People from Charlestown, Boston
1932 births